Bom Yeoreum Gaeul Kyeoul (Hangul: 봄여름가을겨울; lit. Spring Summer Autumn Winter), also known as SSAW, was a jazz-rock fusion band from South Korea. 

SSAW debuted in 1988.  It had the hit songs, "Bravo, My Life," and "Somebody's Dream." SSAW  disbanded on December 28, 2018, following the death of member Tae-gwan.

History

1980s
In 1986, Jong Jin-sim, Tae-kwan Jeon, Jae-ha Yoo, and Ki-ho Jang formed a group named Bom Yeoreum Gaeul Kyeoul (meaning "spring, summer, fall, winter" in Korean) with Kim Hyun-sik.

Jae-ha Yoo left the band, Seong-shik Park joined, and they released a record, Hyeon-shik Kim and Bom Yeo-reum Gaeul Kyeo-ul. The album carries a song “Lonely afternoon,” composed by Jong-jin Kim.

In 1988, Jong-jin Kim and Tae-kwan Jeon split off and released their first record, Bom Yeoreum Gaeul Kyeoul. Three songs of the 10 were instrumental works. SSAW  was the first group to make an instrumental work a title song in Korea. Other popular songs in this album included "Everyone is likely to change" and "All-the-time happy people.”

In 1989, SSAW released its second record, titled What if my beautiful song could make your heart pure. The songs “Somebody’s dream," “Seventeen and twenty four,” and “Being in my arms” ranked No. 1 in the underground chart.

1990s
In 1991, SSAW  released Korea's first true live album, titled Bom Yeo-reum Gaeul Kyeo-ul Live. With its successful sales amounting to over 1 million, this album opened a new chapter for a live album in the South Korean music industry. Among the new songs listed in this album, "I can walk alone though feeling lonely” and “It’s Fall” are most well known.

In 1992, SSAW worked on its 3rd album, Joke, lie, and truth”in the United States, a first for Korean singers.  The album had a 10-page spread jacket containing photographer Jung-man Kim's photos in New York. “Opening the 10 year ago diary” and “An outsider” are the most representative songs included in this album.

In 1993, SSAW  released the 4th album, I Photograph to Remember .  “About eternity” and “The past story about the lost bicycle” included in this album were popular songs.

In 1994, the 5th record Mystery”was released. The album begins with a Morse code signal conveying a message, “we wanna go back to the past”. Songs included “The beauty” which was a remade song sung by Jung-hyeon Shin originally and “2:05 am.”

In 1996, the 6th record, Banana Shake was released in celebration of the group's 10th anniversary which came out with a canned case. It was the first attempt to make a CD case in a can-like look in Korea.  Singers  Hae-cheol Shin, Hyeon-do Lee, Ju-no Lee, and So-ra Lee participated in this album . The most popular songs in this album are “Banana shake” and “When things are not going well.”

In 1998, the group released the album, Best of the Best. This album is composed of 2 CDs: one is a compilation of songs; the other is that of instrumental works which had been released through the past records. “Bom Yeo-reum Gaeul Kyeo-ul” and “All-the-time happy people” were remade by a new arrangement. The album includes a new song “Always, it’s winter.”

2000s
In 2000, SSAW released “SSaW LIVE!” a video of a limited edition, producing only 2000 copies. The video was a recording of the live concert held in the round rotating stage at the Culture & Sports Complex on December 31, 1999.

In 2002, SSAW's  7th official record, Bravo, My Life! was released. On the Internet, “Too old to rock'n'roll, too young to die” and “Come back to me” were released as a hidden track. Singers Hee-yeol Yoo, Hyeong-cheol Kim, Sang Yoon, and Jeok Lee participated in this album. “Bravo, My Life!” and “Conciliatory sonata” were popular songs.

In 2003, “Best of the Best” was re-released in a form of photo album by Jung-man Kim, renamed as “BEST OF THE BEST BOM YEO-REUM GAEUL KYEO-UL SONGS, INSTRUMENTAL AND THEIR STORY.” In September, the CD having songs and the one having instrumental works were released separately.

In 2005, a video album “I am Ssaw Dizzy,” recording the wine concert held at Club Cosmo in November 2004 was released. Since releasing this album, the group began to work with a wine & music series. This album has a 3-member group's rock style, which was very far from the typical music style of Bom Yeo-Reum Gaeul Kyeo-ul.

In 2006, SSAW released “Oh, Happy Day!,” the 2nd live video album of the “wine & music series” recording the 2nd wine concert held at Club Agua in November 2005. This album contains the previous songs of SSaW which were arranged in a Latin & Reggae style.

In 2007, SSAW  released “Feel SsaW Good,” the 3rd live video album of the “wine & music series” recording the 3rd wine concert held at Casa del Vino in November 2006. This album contains the previous songs of SSaW, which were arranged in an urban jazz style.

In 2008, as a result of the 3-year-long lawsuit on copyright, SSAW  obtained the copyright for the above mentioned records on and offline and offline compilation as well.

On December 28, 2018, it was announced that Tae Kwan had died after a 6-year battle with cancer, effectively ending SSAW .

Discography

Studio albums

References 

South Korean musical groups
South Korean folk rock groups
Musical groups established in 1988